Arthington Worsley (Marylebone, London 9 December 1861 – Middlesex, 13 January 1944) was a British botanist, explorer and civil engineer, who carried out extensive botanical expeditions in South America. He also played two first-class cricket matches for the Marylebone Cricket Club, playing once in 1888 and 1890 respectively.

Awards 
1937. Herbert medal.

Eponyms 
 (Amaryllidaceae) Worsleya (Traub) Traub 1944

Publications 
 
  originally published 1896
 1907.  Concepts of monism. Ed. London : T. Fisher Unwin. xv + 356 pp.

References

Bibliography 
 1936.  Life and career of Arthington Worsley : an autobiography. Herbertia 3 : 10–19
  
 Harvard Botanist Index
 

1861 births
1944 deaths
English botanists
English cricketers
Marylebone Cricket Club cricketers